Enrique José Varona (April 13, 1848, Puerto Principe, Cuba – November 13, 1933, Havana) was a Cuban author.

He was educated in Puerto Principe, and began his literary career in 1864 as a contributor to reviews. In 1874, he moved to Havana, dividing his time between teaching and journalism. In 1885 he was elected representative for Puerto Principe in the Cortes in Madrid. In 1885 he founded the Revista Cubana, a literary, scientific, and philosophical review.

Works
 Odas Anacreónticas (Puerto Principe, 1868)
 Poesías (Havana, 1878)
 Paisajes Cubanos (1879)
 Conferencias filosóficas: Lógica (1880)
 Conferencias filosóficas: Psicología (1881)
 Estudios literarios y filosóficos (1883)
 Seis Conferencias (Barcelona, 1887)

His Lógica has been translated into French.

References

1849 births
1933 deaths
People from Camagüey
Vice presidents of Cuba
Members of the Congress of Deputies of the Spanish Restoration
Cuban male writers